Felix Joseph Gillan (1903–1986) was a Scottish professional footballer who played as a centre-half. He played the majority of his career in the Scottish leagues, but made 11 appearances for Football League Third Division North club Nelson in the 1928–29 season.

References

1903 births
1986 deaths
Scottish footballers
Association football defenders
Ayr United F.C. players
Queen of the South F.C. players
Nelson F.C. players
Raith Rovers F.C. players
Scottish Football League players
English Football League players